W25FG-D, virtual channel 36 (UHF digital channel 25), is a low-powered television station licensed to Darby, Pennsylvania, United States. The station is owned by HC2 Holdings.

History 
The station’s construction permit was issued on July 9, 1990 under the callsign of W55BT.  On June 11, 2008, it moved to the former callsign W36DO-D. As part of the FCC repack, W36DO-D is moving to physical channel 25. On December 30, 2020, it moved to the current callsign W25FG-D.

On December 31 of 2022 Azteca America ceased operations.

Digital channels
The station's digital signal is multiplexed:

References

External links

Low-power television stations in the United States
Innovate Corp.
Television stations in Illinois
Television channels and stations established in 1993
1990 establishments in Illinois